Tooktocaugee was an unincorporated community in Calhoun County, Alabama, United States. Tooktocaugee was formerly the site of a Creek Indian village.

References 

Unincorporated communities in Calhoun County, Alabama
Unincorporated communities in Alabama
Ghost towns in Alabama
Muscogee tribal towns
Ghost towns in the United States
Towns in Alabama
Towns in the United States
Alabama placenames of Native American origin